Challenge 2 is a 2012 Indian Bengali action comedy film directed by Raja Chanda starring Dev and Pooja Bose in lead roles. The film is a spiritual sequel to the 2009 Bengali film Challenge, but contains a very different storyline. Major parts of the movie were shot in Malaysia, Dubai and f 2011 Telugu film Dookudu, directed by Srinu Vaitla and starring Mahesh Babu and Samantha Ruth Prabhu. The film was blockbuster at box office collection.

Plot
Debraj Roy is an independent MLA of the constituency of Debnagar, which is named after him, in West Bengal, and is regarded as a champion for the poor and one who have idealistic values. When a truck collides with the car his brother Angshuman Roy and he are in, Debraj goes into a coma. Except for his family, everyone else presumes that he is killed in the accident. Years later, his son Abhiraj "Abhi" Roy is a police officer in Mumbai who fights against the mafia and is on a mission to apprehend a mafia don Guru Nayak who is involved in illegal drug trade, extortion and arms trafficking.

When he heads to Kuala Lumpur in an undercover operation, he meets Pooja, the daughter of Abhi's senior police officer, Madhusudan Bakshi and soon falls in love with her. She initially rejects his advances which makes him give up. However, he is successful in the undercover operation and arrests Nayak's brother Bunty. After returning to India, he again meets Pooja and, to his surprise, she reciprocates his feelings. In an attempt to arrest Nayak, Bunty and the police commissioner is killed and Debraj's loyal follower Shivu reveals to Abhi that Nayak, along with Debraj's rival, Apurba Ghosh, and Debraj's other followers including Jagganath and Krishnakanto Mitro were behind Debraj's accident, which makes Abhi plot to kill them all.

When Debraj comes out of the coma, the doctors who treated him advise his family that his life is at risk if he encounters or hears anything upsetting, disturbing or shocking. Abhi hides the events surrounding the accident and shifts his family to his previously abandoned mansion which is now being used for film-making. Abhi creates a dummy political set-up at this mansion. In the guise of a reality television program, Abhi tricks an aspiring but unsuccessful film actor Swarnakamal by making him believe that the television show is being sponsored by actor Mithun Chakraborty's television show, and that Mithun Chakraborty wants to offer Swarnakamal very high remuneration for his realistic performance in the show. On the other hand, an aspiring actor Premjit and Apurba Ghosh are tricked by Abhi with a real estate business deal to exploit his criminal nexus.

Abhi keeps this drama under wraps from Debraj by making him believe that Abhi is also an MLA revered by people fulfilling his father's wishes. He marries Pooja after gaining her family's consent much to Debraj's delight. Meanwhile, Abhi manages to kill Jogonnath and Apurba without the knowledge of anybody while Debraj believes that they died due to ailments. Nayak reaches Kolkata to kill Abhi and Abhi's drama is exposed before everybody except Debraj. Abhi killed Guru Nayak's gang members and others in an encounter while Nayak is later killed in a Ramlila event. Debraj too learns of Abhi's drama and is happy for the affection his son showed on him.

Cast
 Dev as IPS Officer Abhiraj "Abhi" Roy
 Pooja Bose as Pooja Bakshi
 Tapas Paul as MLA Debraj Roy
 Ashish Vidyarthi as Mafia King Guru Nayak
 Rajatava Dutta as Madhushudhan Bakshi
 Kharaj Mukherjee as Swarnakamal
 Surajit Sen as Bunty
 Deepankar De as Apurba Ghosh (deceased)
 Laboni Sarkar as Pooja's mother
 Subhasish Mukherjee as Premjit
 Bharat Kaul as Police Commissioner Puulak Ghosh (deceased)
 Joyjit Banerjee as Joydeep, Abhi's colleague
 Biswanath Basu as Babla, a film artist supplier
 Kushal Chakraborty as Angshuman Roy (deceased)
 Kaushik Chakraborty as Shibu, Debraj Roy's henchman
 Debesh Raychowdhury as Krishnakanto Mitra
 Arun Bannerjee as Akhilesh, Abhi's uncle
 Tulika Basu as Abhi's aunt
 Sumit Ganguly as Jagannath 
 Kunal Padhy as the new Police Commissioner
 Raj Chakraborty as film director (cameo)
 Arghya Basu as a corrupt police officer
 Rittika Sen as Liza, Pooja's sister
 Pradip Dhar as Cool Babu
 Rajat Ganguly as Anondo, Abhi's uncle
 Jahidul Islam Shuvo as IPS, Dev's friend
 Vashcar Dev as IPS, Dev's friend
 Mousumi Saha as Abhi's mother (deceased, flashback) (special appearance in footage)

Release
The film released on 19 October 2012 (Durga panchami) just before the Durga Pujo weekend in 270 theatres across India including West Bengal, Kolkata, Mumbai, Delhi, Bihar, Assam, Tripura, Madhya Pradesh and Chhattisgarh and is being screened in both single screen and multiplexes. According to  Producer Mr. Mahendra Soni – this is the first time a non-double-version Bengali flick has been released in 270 theatres across the country and continues its successful run in the non-niche segment of core viewers outside Bengal.

Soundtrack

The soundtrack of the film was scored by Jeet Gannguli and Savvy.

References

External links
 

2012 films
Indian action comedy films
Films scored by Savvy Gupta
2012 action comedy films
Films scored by Jeet Ganguly
Films shot in Kolkata
Bengali remakes of Telugu films
Fictional portrayals of the West Bengal Police
2012 masala films
Bengali-language Indian films
2010s Bengali-language films
Films directed by Raja Chanda
2012 comedy films